Christopher Stewart Martin (born 10 December 1974) is a former New Zealand cricketer. A right-arm fast-medium bowler, Martin played provincial cricket for Auckland, having formerly played for the Canterbury Wizards.

He also signed for the English county cricket side, Warwickshire, for their 2008 domestic campaign and played one first-class match for Essex in 2010. In 1999 he played a season of club cricket in Scotland for Heriots FP Cricket Club.

He retired from all cricket in late 2013.

International career
Martin is one of seven New Zealand Test cricketers to have taken 200 wickets. In 2011 he was recognised as New Zealand's premier cricketer, when he was awarded the inaugural Sir Richard Hadlee Medal, at the New Zealand cricket awards ceremony. Although predominantly a Test bowler, Martin moved back into contention for One Day Internationals after International Cricket Council rule changes permitted substitutions during games. Although the rule has since been revoked, Martin has remained on the fringes of the ODI squad and was called up to the New Zealand World Cup 2007 squad, as a replacement for the injured Daryl Tuffey.

Batting action
Martin was well known for being an extremely poor batsman, even by the low standards generally expected of tail-end batsman, and his batting gained him more publicity than his bowling. Martin has the rather dubious distinction of belonging to a select group of cricketers whose number of wickets taken exceeds runs scored; Bhagwat Chandrasekhar is the only other cricketer to meet this distinction (assuming a qualification of 30 Tests played), and only Holcombe “Hopper” Read – who played when pitches were uncovered – has played Test cricket and finished with a lower first-class batting average than Martin. Martin holds the record for the most pairs recorded in Test match history (7). He is also the only cricketer to be dismissed for a diamond duck (run out on 0 without facing a ball) twice in Test cricket – against England in 2004 and South Africa in 2013.

On 9 January 2011, Martin notched up the milestone of 100 career Test match runs in the 1st Test against Pakistan at Seddon Park. He took his 500th wicket in first-class cricket, with the dismissal of Tanvir Ahmed on the third day of the first Test against Pakistan in January 2011.

Retirement
On 3 July 2013 Martin announced his retirement from all forms of cricket. He bowed out as the third highest Test wicket-taker in New Zealand’s history.

References

External links
 

1974 births
Living people
Auckland cricketers
Canterbury cricketers
Warwickshire cricketers
New Zealand One Day International cricketers
New Zealand Test cricketers
New Zealand Twenty20 International cricketers
New Zealand cricketers
Essex cricketers
South Island cricketers